Forelius is a Neotropical genus of ants in the subfamily Dolichoderinae. The genus is known from southern United States to Argentina.

Species
Forelius albiventris Forel, 1912
Forelius andinus Kusnezov, 1957
Forelius bahianus Cuezzo, 2000
Forelius brasiliensis (Forel, 1908)
Forelius breviscapus Forel, 1914
Forelius chalybaeus Emery, 1906
Forelius damiani Guerrero & Fernández, 2008
Forelius grandis Forel, 1912
Forelius keiferi Wheeler, 1934
Forelius lilloi Cuezzo, 2000
Forelius macrops Kusnezov, 1957
Forelius maranhaoensis Cuezzo, 2000
Forelius mccooki (McCook, 1880)
Forelius nigriventris Forel, 1912
Forelius pruinosus (Roger, 1863)
Forelius pusillus Santschi, 1922
Forelius rubriceps Gallardo, 1916
Forelius rufus Gallardo, 1916

References

External links

Dolichoderinae
Ant genera
Hymenoptera of North America
Hymenoptera of South America